Xenophile may refer to:
Xenophilia, affection for unknown or foreign objects or peoples
Xenophile Records, a world music record label
XXXenophile, an American erotic comic book series